Felix Micael Hörberg (born 19 May 1999) is a Swedish footballer who plays for Östersunds FK.

References

Swedish footballers
Allsvenskan players
1999 births
Living people
Trelleborgs FF players
Association football midfielders